Harald Krassnitzer (born 10 September 1960, in Grödig, Austria) is an Austrian actor.

Life 
Krassnitzer grew up in Grödig, in the Flachgau district in Salzburg state, Austria. His father was a locksmith, while his mother worked in a candy factory. After graduating from the HTL in Eisenstadt, he was trained as a forwarding agent.

Krassnitzer was trained as an actor at the Elisabethbühne in Salzburg, where he was employed for four years upon the completion of his studies. After that he played at the Schauspielhaus Graz in Graz, the Wiener Volkstheater in Vienna and the Saarland State Theatre in Saarbrücken.

Since 1995, Krassnitzer has acted mainly in television series (Der Bergdoktor, Der Winzerkönig, Tatort). He has been playing the role of the investigator Moritz Eisner in the Tatort series for the ORF since 1999, partly alone, and partly with changing colleagues. Since his 24th case, he is now working with Bibi Fellner, played by Adele Neuhauser.

He appeared as a co-moderator alongside Peter Rapp at the Licht ins Dunkel Gala in 1998. In summer 1999, Krassnitzer presented the film series Wunderland as a personal love letter to Austria, in which he presented his favorite music and his favorite places.

Krassnitzer is committed to Hilfswerk Austria. He is co-owner of the company Blinklicht, a production company for mobile TV, which he founded in Vienna with two childhood friends.

Since 7 July 2009, he is married to German actress Ann-Kathrin Kramer, with whom he previously was romantically involved for more than nine years. He currently lives in Wuppertal and has a second home in the Tirol region (Mieming).

Harald Krassnitzer is a social democrat and regularly supports the Social Democratic Party of Austria.

Works

Theatre 
 Prince in "Yvonne, Princess of Burgund" by Witold Gombrowicz, 1987
 Jojo in "Das Gauklermärchen", Michael Ende, 1987, Elisabethbühne
 Peer Gynt in "Peer Gynt", Henrik Ibsen
 King Johann in "König Johann", Friedrich Dürrenmatt
 Hamlet in "Hamlet", Heiner Müller
 Oedipus in "King Oedipus" and "Oedipus at Colonos", Sophokles
 Xerxes in "The Persians", Volker Braun (Aischylos)
 Karl Moor in "The Robbers", Friedrich Schiller
 Faust in "Faust I und II", with Johann Wolfgang von Goethe
 Primislaus in "Libussa" with Franz Grillparzer
 Truffaldino in "Diener zweier Herren" with Carlo Goldoni
 Fernando in "Stella" with  Johann Wolfgang von Goethe

Filmography (selection) 
 1996: Der Pakt – Wenn Kinder töten
 1997: Stockinger – Spuren in den Tod
 1997: Der Bergdoktor (TV series)
 1998: Hurenmord – Ein Priester schweigt
 1999: Rosamunde Pilcher – Der lange Weg zum Glück 
 1999/2000: Kanadische Träume – Eine Familie wandert aus (TV miniseries)
 Episodes: 1. Der Aufbruch, 2. Das neue Leben, 3. Umwege der Liebe
 Since 1999: Tatort (TV series), as Moritz Eisner
 2003: Ausgeliefert
 2003: Amundsen der Pinguin
 2003: MA 2412 – Die Staatsdiener
 2003: Aus Liebe zu Tom
 2003: Gefährliche Gefühle
 2003: Das Traumschiff – Sambia und die Viktoriafälle
 2004: Der Ferienarzt… auf Korfu
 2004: 
 2004: Weißblaue Wintergeschichten 
 2004: Stauffenberg
 2005: Im Reich der Reblaus
 2005: Vollgas – Gebremst wird später
 2005: 
 2005–2009: Der Winzerkönig (TV series)
 2008: Unter Strom
 2008: Marie Brand und der Charme des Bösen
 2009: Mein Mann, seine Geliebte und ich (TV film)
 2009: Das Traumschiff – Papua Neuguinea
 2010: 
 2011: 
 2011: Am Kreuzweg
 2011: Aschenputtel
 2012: Der Wettbewerb
 2012: Trau niemals deiner Frau
 2013: Paul Kemp – Alles kein Problem (TV series, 13 episodes)
 2014:  (TV film)
 2014: Blutsschwestern (ORF) / Die Tote in der Berghütte (ZDF)
 2014: Fluss des Lebens – Wiedersehen an der Donau (TV film)
 2014: Katie Fforde: Geschenkte Jahre (TV film)
 2015: Meine fremde Frau
 2016: Die Kunst des Krieges

Awards 
 2000: Romy – Most popular series
 2014: Grimme-Preis for Tatort: Angezählt

References

External links 
 
 
 Official Website of Harald Krassnitzer
 Official page of Harald Krassnizter on Facebook

1960 births
Social Democratic Party of Austria politicians
Austrian male actors
Living people
Austrian male stage actors